Koza  is a village in the administrative district of Gmina Polska Cerekiew, within Kędzierzyn-Koźle County, Opole Voivodeship, in south-western Poland.

The German name indicates that the village was founded in the Middle Ages by German settlers.

The village has a population of 61.

References

Koza